Arabs in Malta (Maltese: Għarab f'Malta) are mostly expatriates from a range of Arab countries, particularly Libya and Syria. This list includes both first-generation and second-generation expatriates.

Notable people 

 Rachid Chouhal (born 1975), athlete – born in Morocco
 Carlo Gimach (1651–1730), architect, engineer and poet – descendant of a Palestinian Catholic refugee

See also 

 Arab diaspora
 Arabs in Europe
 Syrian diaspora
 Demographics of Malta
 Immigration to Malta
 Islam in Malta
 Aghlabids

References 

Arab diaspora in Europe
Demographics of Malta
Ethnic groups in Malta